Chittamuru is a village and a Mandal in Tirupati district in the state of Andhra Pradesh in India.

References 

Villages in Nellore district